Crossoloricaria rhami is a species of armored catfish found in the upper Amazon basin of Ecuador and Peru.  This species grows to a length of  SL.

References 
 

Loricariini
Fish of South America
Fish of Ecuador
Fish of Peru
Taxa named by Isaäc J. H. Isbrücker
Taxa named by Han Nijssen
Fish described in 1983